"L'Aventurier" is an Indochine song on the album of the same name in 1982. It reached No 4 in the French music chart.

Conception
L'Aventurier evokes the world of Bob Morane, mentioning characters (Miss Ylang-Ylang) and titles from his novels. It is also implicitly referred to other novels, such as  La Couronne de Golconde  ( Crocodiles ). In an interview with  Figaro , Nicola Sirkis recounted how he found the theme for this song, which he wrote in four hours.

«At the time, we were in the middle of the trip Rambo, the invincible heroes ... I went to search the library that I had brought back from Belgium, I found Bob Morane with incredible titles, which matched the music very well. So I stole all the titles of all the books that Henri Vernes had written, I moved them, relocated, to recompose a story.

Indeed, the lyrics of the song relate to several titles of  Bob Morane novels: La Vallée infernale, the first of the series mentioned soon the beginning of L'Aventurier ("Égaré dans la vallée infernale "), "L'Ombre jaune " ("A la recherche de l'Ombre Jaune ") "La marque de Kali " ("Le bandit s'appelle Mister Kali Jones "),"Trafic aux Caraïbes " ("Stop au trafic des Caraïbes "), "Le Sultan de Jarawak " ("Prisonnière du Sultan de Jarawak "), "Terreur à la Manicouagan " ("En pleine terreur à Manicouagan "), "Le Mystérieux Docteur Xhatan " ("L'otage des guerriers du Doc Xhatan ") ... Some terms, on the other hand, fall under the pure imagination of Nicola Sirkis, as "Operation Nadawieb". Some of the novels mentioned by Henri Vernes belonged to the library he had built up when he lived in Uccle, in Belgium, until he was 15 years old.

Genesis 
According to the manuscript published in the book  Kissing my songs  (Flammarion, 2011),  L'Aventurier  was written by Nicola Sirkis in December 1981., at a time when Bob Morane's aura had already begun to wither  Nicola Sirkis had discovered Bob Morane, a hero created by the Belgian novelist Henri Vernes for the pocket collection "Marabout Junior, when he was in boarding school in Belgium in 12 years. "At that age, for us, it could only be a model, we dreamed of becoming Bob Morane," said Nicola Sirkis, who was also marked by another adventurer, but this time of cinema: Indiana Jones. Steven Spielberg's film  Raiders of the Lost Ark  had just been released in 1981, a year before L'Aventurier .

The song, along with several others from the album L'Aventurier, was recorded at the Aguessau studio, in Paris, in September 1982, during a session that was to be devoted solely to their first single, "Dizzidence Politik". The song "The Adventurer" was decisive in the choice of their producer of the time, Didier Guinochet, to finance their first album. In front of B 45-rounds, there is another song from their first album: "Indochina (the 7 days of Beijing)". The cover of the disc, whose design was made by the graphic designer Marion Bataille, become the companion of Nicola Sirkis. and the photo by J.-F. Rousseau, stylistically represents the four members of the group, with an Asian-inspired typography.

Reception 
On Antenna 2, the broadcast Platine 45,devoted to music videos, broadcasts that of  L'Aventurier February 16, 1983, before a special show devoted to the group Indochina on March 11, 1983,

Musically, Sud Ouest judged that this piece is distinguished by its "ultra dancing, bouncy and playful pop rock"

The journalist Rebecca Manzoni notes that L'Aventurier "Introduces in the introduction a ritornello inspired by Asia, supported by futuristic sounds (...), followed by a guitar riff composed by Dominique Nicolas, a riff so effective that it allows to identify the song

In 2017, Le Point felt that the song remains "the best known of the band"

"Since 1982, this song continues to resonate on the dance floors of discotheques or parties with friends, when it is the turn of the tubes of the eighties," notes his side "Ouest France"

When she mixed as a DJ in parties, the Italian actress Asia Argento tells that she was playing this song

References

External links
Official video

1982 singles
Indochine (band) songs
Bob Morane
1982 songs